General Council elections were held in Réunion in September and October 1988. Right-wing independents emerged as the largest bloc in the Council, winning 19 seats.

Results

Aftermath
Following the elections, right-wing independent Eric Boyer was elected President of the Council.

References

Reunon
Elections in Réunion
1988 in Réunion
Election and referendum articles with incomplete results